Non-aggression Pact (abbv. as N.A.P.) was an urban-electro-industrial music group from Tampa, Florida formed by Jeff Hillard and Jason Whitcomb.

History

The band was formed in 1990 by keyboardist/drummer, Jeff Hillard (a.k.a. Chillard) and keyboardist/vocalist Jason Whitcomb. Their music featured an abrasive industrial-dance sound, with funky, grind-hop drum loops overlain by harsh vocals and thought-provoking audio samples from various movies and documentaries. Their lyrics focused mostly on the issues of racism and mass media.

N.A.P. released their first album Gesticulate in 1993 with bassist and pianist Dan Bates on the now defunct General Purpose Cassettes (G.P.C.) label. The electronic music was composed and sequenced with an Ensoniq EPS 16+ digital sampler. Additional sounds were taken from a Roland Juno-106 analog synthesizer.

The G.P.C. label usually sold merchandise with unusual packaging, as such, the Gesticulate CD was a limited-edition release with an aluminum foil cover and screen-printed artwork. The cassette tape version was sold in a metal can. There were two different versions of the CD cover printed.

The band's second release was 9mm Grudge in 1994 on the California-based Re-Constriction recording label. It was more guitar driven, however much of it was sampled including a riff from Van Halen appearing in a song.

Five years later, Broadcast-Quality Belligerence was released. This marked a change in production with a shift to PC based recording software instead of their previous "Live Take" approach via DAT. This also appears to be the band's final commercial release. Newer material was released on their MP3.com page until the site changed formats.

Discography
Non-Aggression Pact — Cass, EP 1990 – Retroflex Records	
.5 Honkey/Wreckage + Ruin + & + Regrets + [Redemption] – Cass 1991, all Side A tracks (with Side B feat. Mentallo and the Fixer) – GPC Productions
Repossessed/Non-Aggression Pact – 2xCass 1992, all cassette #1 (with cassette #2 feat. Xorcist) – GPC Productions
Gesticulate – CD Album 1992 – GPC Productions
9mm Grudge – CD Album 1994 – Re-constriction Records
Spent Casings: Gesticulate Reloaded - CD Album 1995 – 24 Hr. Service Station/IODA
Broadcast-Quality Belligerence – CD Album 1998 – Re-constriction Records

Compilation appearances

"Gárgula Mecânica" World Electrostatic Assembly – CD 1992, track #4 "The Debriefing" - Simbiose Records
Death Rave 2000 – CD 1993, track #6 "Holy Babel (Receptor Mix)" and track #9 "Razor" - 21st Circuity
Grid Slinger – LP 1993, side B, track #2 "Powder Keg", and side B, track #4 "Der Angriff" - Re-constriction Records, Cleopatra
Rivet Head Culture – CD 1993, track #1 "Wicked Painted Sun" - If It Moves...
Shut Up Kitty: A Cyber-Based Covers Compilation – CD 1993, track #11 "Boy (1 Bullet mix)" - Re-constriction Records
Chambermade – Cass 1995, side B, track #3 "Blown Livid" - Re-constriction Records
Frostbyte – Cass 1995, side A, track 5 "Wicked Painted Sun" and side B, track #5 "Flask Edit" - Re-constriction Records
21st Circuitry Shox – CD 1996, track #13 "Razor" - 21st Circuitry
Built for Stomping – CD Promo Sampler 1996, track #16 "Bleeding Messiah" - Re-constriction Records, Cleopatra
Re-Constriction 10* Year Anniversary – CD Promo 1998, track #10 "Blown Livid" - Re-constriction Records
Cyberpunk Fiction – CD 1998, track #14 "Flowers on the Wall" - Re-constriction Records
Black Sunshine: The Tampa Underground & Beyond – 2xCD 2002, disc 1, track #5 "Celtic Frog" and disc 2, track #4 "I Know Your Crimes" - Cleopatra

References

External links
Non-Aggression Pact mp3's

American electro-industrial music groups
Electronic music groups from Florida
24 Hour Service Station artists
Re-Constriction Records artists